Penstemon osterhoutii, common name Osterhout's beardtongue, is an herbaceous perennial occurring in the United States state of Colorado.    It is named in honor of George Everett Osterhout.

References

osterhoutii
Flora of the United States